Rakhi ka Insaaf is an Indian tabloid talk show hosted by actress and item girl Rakhi Sawant Produced by I AM Production (Akash Chopra Amrit Sagar) aired on NDTV Imagine. It's mostly based on Jerry Springer.

Controversy 

The show is controversial for Sawant's use of obscene language. The show has been slammed by the Information & Broadcasting Ministry of the Indian Government as well as the Allahabad High Court. Sawant has been accused of abetting suicide of a participant of the show. The family members of the participant maintained that the participant had slipped into depression and killed himself as Sawant had called him impotent on air. As on 8 Dec 2010, the Allahabad High Court reserved its judgement regarding the guilt of Sawant in the abetment of suicide of the participant. The court observed the choice of language of the anchor were very offensive and uncivil. The bench also stated that the anchor should not transgress the bounds of ethical value. Sawant's arrest was however stayed as there was no suicide note left by the deceased vindicating Sawant. The Information & Broadcasting Ministry had ordered that the time slots for the show on NDTV Imagine and Bigg Boss aired on Colors be changed from prime time to 11 p.m. until 3 December 2010. The shows were also directed to run a disclaimer stating that their content were not suitable for children. News channels were also directed to not broadcast footage from these shows. The Bombay High Court had stayed this order.

References

Indian television series